Elisabeth Ohlson (born 28 May 1961) is a Swedish photographer and an artist. In her works she often photographs representatives of LGBT people.

Ohlson, a lesbian, is most noted for her exhibition Ecce homo which portrayed Jesus among gay and transgender people. The scenes were modern versions of stories of the New Testament, such as Jesus riding a bicycle in a gay parade, paralleling the triumphal entry of Jesus riding into Jerusalem on a donkey. With the work, Ohlson wanted to remind people that Jesus worked with and helped the outcasts of the society. She had the idea when one of her friends died of AIDS in the early 1990s.

The first Ecce Homo exhibition was held in Stockholm in 1998. Later an exhibition was held in Uppsala Cathedral which the archbishop K. G. Hammar had approved. Later Ecce Homo toured around the world. An Ecce Homo exhibition opened on 3 October 2012 in Belgrade, Serbia, then the only city in that part of Europe in which an exhibition of Ecce Homo had been held. The exhibit had to be protected by 24/7 security guards.

In 2009, the Swedish Humanist Association awarded Ohlson the Ingemar Hedenius prize for secular humanism.

The Eskilstuna Art Museum held an Ohlson retrospective in 2015, covering her work from 1988 through 2012.

References

External links 
 
Interview with Elisabeth Ohlson (in Swedish)
Ohlson's work on Artnet

1961 births
Living people
Lesbian photographers
Swedish lesbian artists
Swedish LGBT photographers
Swedish women photographers
20th-century Swedish photographers
21st-century Swedish photographers
20th-century women photographers
21st-century women photographers
20th-century Swedish women